The 1985 Chrysler Tournament of Champions  was a women's tennis tournament played on outdoor clay courts at the Hyatt Regency Grand Cypress in Orlando, Florida in the United States that was part of the Category 4 tier of the 1985 Virginia Slims World Championship Series. It was the sixth edition of the tournament and was held from April 22 through April 28, 1985. First-seeded Martina Navratilova won her sixth consecutive singles title at the event and earned $50,000 first-prize money. The event marked the return to the WTA Tour of Regina Maršíková after an absence of three and a half years.

Finals

Singles
 Martina Navratilova defeated  Katerina Maleeva 6–1, 6–0
 It was Navratilova's 5th singles title of the year and the 104th of her career.

Doubles
 Martina Navratilova /  Pam Shriver defeated  Elise Burgin /  Kathleen Horvath 6–3, 6–1

References

External links
 International Tennis Federation (ITF) tournament edition details

Chrysler Tournament of Champions
United Airlines Tournament of Champions
Chrysler Tournament of Champions
Chrysler Tournament of Champions
Chrysler Tournament of Champions